John Jacob Cornwell (July 11, 1867 – September 8, 1953) was a Democratic politician from Romney in Hampshire County, West Virginia. Cornwell served as the 15th Governor of the US state of West Virginia. Cornwell also served in the West Virginia Senate as a state senator (1899–1905).

Background 
John Jacob Cornwell was born on a farm near the community of Pennsboro in Ritchie County into a family of Welsh origin whose ancestor Peter Cornwell, born in Wales in 1634 , settled in the Virginia Colony. When John J. Cornwell was three years old in 1870, his family moved to Hampshire County in West Virginia's Eastern Panhandle. Cornwell attended Shepherd University in Shepherdstown at the age of sixteen and became a school teacher upon graduating in Hampshire County.

In 1890, Cornwell and his brother, William B. Cornwell, acquired the Romney Hampshire Review and assumed the roles of publishers and editors of the newspaper. In 1892, he married Edna Brady.  In 1897, Cornwell and his brother bought out the competing paper, the South Branch Intelligencer, adding its name and 1829 founding date to the Review's masthead.

Political Office
Cornwell was admitted to the bar in 1898 and served as a state senator from 1899 to 1905. Cornwell was defeated in his first gubernatorial bid by William Mercer Owens Dawson in 1904, but was elected governor in 1916, took office in March 1917, and served until 1921. In 1917, Cornwell became the only Democrat to serve as governor in a thirty-six-year span between 1897 and 1933. In fact, Cornwell was the only Democrat elected to a statewide office in 1916.

One month after Cornwell took office as governor, the United States entered World War I and due in part to his efforts, the state of West Virginia had one of the highest percentages of volunteers of any state. Also during his term, the state reached an agreement on a public debt figure owed to Virginia since West Virginia's statehood in 1863. Cornwell advocated strengthening the mining code, the creation of a state board of education, and the establishment of the West Virginia Department of Public Safety, now officially known as the West Virginia State Police. He supported woman's suffrage, adding it to the agenda for a special session of the legislature in February 1920. West Virginia became the 34th state to ratify the federal constitutional amendment for women's right to vote.

Cornwell's term was not unblemished, however, and was marked by growing labor unrest in the coal industry of southern West Virginia. Cornwell discouraged an armed miners' march in 1919 by assuring them he would address the miners' grievances. His failure to handle the situation led to increased violence, including the infamous shootout between miners and coal company guards in Matewan, Mingo County.

After leaving office in 1921, John J. Cornwell served as a director and general counsel for the Baltimore and Ohio Railroad Company.

Death
Upon retirement, he lived at his home on Main Street in Romney. Cornwell contracted pneumonia in the summer of 1953 and died at Cumberland Memorial Hospital in Cumberland, Maryland on September 8, 1953. He is interred with his wife and son in Romney's Indian Mound Cemetery. Cornwell descendants continue to run the Hampshire Review today.

John J. Cornwell Elementary School in Levels is named for him because of his background in and strong support of education in the state of West Virginia.

References

External links

Biography of John J. Cornwell
Inaugural Address of John J. Cornwell
The Hampshire Review

1867 births
1953 deaths
19th-century American lawyers
20th-century American lawyers
American bank presidents
American newspaper publishers (people)
American people of Welsh descent
American railway entrepreneurs
Burials at Indian Mound Cemetery
Cornwell family
Deaths from pneumonia in Maryland
Editors of West Virginia newspapers
Democratic Party governors of West Virginia
People from Ritchie County, West Virginia
People from Romney, West Virginia
Baltimore and Ohio Railroad people
Shepherd University alumni
West Virginia lawyers
Democratic Party West Virginia state senators
Schoolteachers from West Virginia
19th-century American politicians
20th-century American politicians
Members of the Odd Fellows